Macaroni salad is a type of pasta salad, served cold made with cooked elbow macaroni and usually prepared with mayonnaise. Much like potato salad or coleslaw in its use, it is often served as a side dish to barbecue, fried chicken, or other picnic style dishes. Like any dish, national and regional variations abound but generally it is prepared with raw diced onions, dill or sweet pickles and celery and seasoned with salt and pepper.

By country

Australia & New Zealand
In Australia, and New Zealand it is commonly known as pasta salad which is usually made with cooked shell pasta pieces and bought from supermarket delis.

Philippines
In the Philippines, macaroni salad is a dessert or appetizer with a mildly sweet flavor. It does not use onions, pepper, or celery. It typically uses native sweetened jellies, cheese, as well as various fruits in contrast to western macaroni salads. It is commonly consumed during holidays such as Christmas and New Year's Day, as well as parties and gatherings. A common variant adds shredded chicken and is known as chicken salad or chicken macaroni salad.

United States
In the United States, macaroni salad has been described as a "deli staple".
In Hawaii, macaroni salad is a popular staple in plate lunches and is traditionally made with grated onion and macaroni cooked until very soft. In Rochester, New York, macaroni salad is served as an element of the Garbage Plate. In Puerto Rico, macaroni salad may contain mayonnaise, mustard, canned tuna or bits of Spam, onions, Cubanelle peppers and pimentos.

See also

 List of pasta dishes
 List of salads
 Pasta salad
 Sopas
 Filipino spaghetti

References

Further reading

 

Macaroni dishes
Noodle salads
World cuisine